Kenneth A. Evans (November 9, 1898 – December 11, 1970) was an American Republican businessman and politician.

Born in Emerson, Iowa, Evans was a World War I veteran and a farm manager. He served on the Emerson City Council. He served in the Iowa State Senate 1937-1945 and then Lieutenant Governor of Iowa 1945-1951 serving under Governors Robert D. Blue and William S. Beardsley. He died in Red Oak, Iowa.

Notes

External links
Kenneth A. Evans, Iowa General Assembly files

1898 births
1970 deaths
People from Mills County, Iowa
Iowa city council members
Republican Party Iowa state senators
Lieutenant Governors of Iowa
20th-century American politicians